Andrea Russell  is an American chemist who is a professor at the University of Southampton. She is Vice President of the International Society of Electrochemistry. Her research considers the use of spectroscopy to better understand the interface between electrodes and electrolytes.

Early life and education 
Russell was an undergraduate student at the University of Michigan. She moved to the University of Utah for graduate studies, where she used infrared spectroscopy to examine electrode surfaces.  After completing her doctorate, Russell was appointed as a research fellow at the United States Naval Research Laboratory.

Research and career 
In 1991, Russell moved to the United Kingdom, where she was appointed to the University of Liverpool. She spent three years in Liverpool before joining Newcastle University. In 1997 Russell moved to the University of Southampton. She was promoted to Professor in 2007.

Russell's research considers the use of spectroscopy to better understand the interface between electrodes and electrolytes. She is particularly interested in gas sensors, metal-air batteries and fuel cells. She makes use of several international facilities, including the Diamond Light Source, ISIS Neutron and Muon Source and the Advanced Light Source. In particular, Russell has developed X-ray absorption spectroscopy for in situ studies of electrocatalysts.

In 2002, Russell chaired the Gordon Research Conference on Fuel Cells. Russell serves on the Engineering and Physical Sciences Research Council (EPSRC) College and the Diamond Light Source Strategic Advisory Committee. A keen user of the Diamond Light Source, Russell serves as Spectroscopy representative for the Diamond User Committee. In 2021 she was elected Vice President of the International Society of Electrochemistry.

Russell is involved with undergraduate and postgraduate teaching at the University of Southampton. She contributes to the Southampton Electrochemistry Summer Schools, which are attended by hundreds of delegates around the world. She was awarded the Faculty of Engineering and Physical Sciences Award for Best Pastoral Support in 2020.

Selected publications

References 

Living people
University of Michigan alumni
University of Utah alumni
Spectroscopists
American women chemists
21st-century chemists
Alumni of the University of Southampton
Year of birth missing (living people)